PledgeMusic was an online direct-to-fan music platform, launched in August 2009. It was started to facilitate musicians looking to pre-sell, market, and distribute projects; such as recordings and concerts. It bore similarities to other artist payment platforms as ArtistShare, Kickstarter, Indiegogo, Patreon, RocketHub and Sellaband. 

The company announced it was facing bankruptcy in May 2019, after a year of artists reporting slow payment problems. The company was granted permission to wind up on 19 August 2019.

History

Formation 
PledgeMusic was formed in the UK and registered with Companies House on 1 October 2008.

In the next few years, a number of complementary companies were also formed under the PledgeMusic banner. They were: PledgeMusic Retail Ltd on 18 June 2009; PledgeMusic Recordings Limited on 18 August 2010 (originally named PledgeMusic 2.0 Limited); and PledgeMusic Publishing on 11 November 2010.

Early successes 
Ginger Wildheart was awarded the 2012 Classic Rock Awards 'Event Of The Year' award for his PledgeMusic campaign.

By 2013, roughly thirty artists that used the site had subsequently signed label recording contracts.

In 2014, PledgeMusic reported a 90% campaign success rate (higher than Kickstarter or Indiegogo), with most artists raising an average 140% of their goal. PledgeMusic and Lynda.com teamed up to produce a documentary about 'super fans' and their role in the future of the music industry. The documentary features footage and interviews from SXSW and interviews with artists such as Nicole Atkins and San Fermin.

Payment issues since 2018 
In early 2019, reports emerged of artists not being paid in accordance with their agreements with PledgeMusic. Also at that time, PledgeMusic's accounts for 2017 had not been filed with Companies House in the UK and by then were 4 months overdue. On 24 January 2019, PledgeMusic issued a statement via its blog page that claimed the company was having “discussions with several strategic players in the industry who have an interest in the PledgeMusic platform” and that it expects "payments will be brought current within the next 90 days."

On January 29, PledgeMusic founder Benji Rogers issued a statement saying he was returning to the company as "a volunteer strategic advisor and observer to the board." While the company was still working to "sort the back payments issue", Rogers claimed that "all funds coming into the company from now on will be managed by an independent third party (to be named soon)."

In February 2019, a company charge was placed on PledgeMusic by Sword, Rowe & Company LLC.

On May 3, a report was published in Digital Music News in which a leaked email was quoted, apparently sent from Robbie Wirdnam, an assistant manager at FRP Advisory LLP, who, according to the email, were due to be appointed as administrators for the winding up of PledgeMusic.com. The email was attempting to find potential buyers for all or part of the PledgeMusic business prior to selling off the company's assets.

Administration and liquidation: May to July 2019 
Benji Rogers, the company's co-founder, stated in a blog post dated May 8 that efforts to sell the company had failed and that "PledgeMusic will shortly be heading into administration". Rogers said that the crowdfunding platform had used money that was pledged for use by musical artists to pay off the company's debts instead. Many artists who were pledged money through the website will most likely not receive the money that was promised to them. John Zorn is among the artists affected, who is owed $197,559, money which was pledged to help him finish his 25-year-long project, The Book Beriah.

On 9 May, Kevin Brennan Labour MP raised the question of musician and consumer protection in light of PledgeMusic's collapse, in Parliament.

By June 5, a number of trade bodies in the United Kingdom, including UK Music, had launched a survey to investigate the impact PledgeMusic's failure would have on the industry.

Sometime between July 13 and July 25, the PledgeMusic.com website became unavailable. The latest archived copy held by web.archive.org was dated July 13.

On July 31, a petition to wind up PledgeMusic.com was heard in the High Court of London. The petition was presented by Russell Rieger on behalf of the directors of PledgeMusic.com, who at that time were Russell Rieger, Joshua Sason, Donald Ienner, Daniel Rowe and David Walsh, and was granted on August 19.

Aftermath of insolvency and liquidation
PledgeMusic went bankrupt before John Zorn and hundreds of other artists were paid money owed via campaign pledges. In November 2019, Failure frontman Ken Andrews alleged PledgeMusic owed them $75,000 from their 2018 album campaign. Andrews further claimed that former CEO Dominic Pandiscia changed the company's policy of ring-fencing artists' money in 2016. Pandiscia denied the claims and mentioned considering legal action against Andrews.

In March 2020, the BBC reported that the band CC Smugglers lost £20,000 when PledgeMusic went bankrupt. It also stated the Insolvency Service was still investigating the company's insolvency.

By September 2021, a startup direct-to-fan site, Sonicly, had hired Benji Rogers as a consultant, in an attempt to avoid making similar mistakes as PledgeMusic. Sonicly plans not to hold any funds paid by fans; instead artists will be paid directly via Square.

Business model 
PledgeMusic considered itself a direct-to-fan platform as opposed to a crowdfunding website. Features that the site claimed distinguished it from similar competitors:
 Sole focus on raising funds for musicians
 Not retaining any ownership or rights to any music created through the platform
 Encourages artists to include contributions to charity
 Absorbs all transaction processing costs involved in pledging on a project
 Encourages artists to offer a wide range of incentives and exclusive content to fans
 No processing of any fund transactions until the fund target reached
 International, accepting artists, projects and pledges from all over the world
 Pledger refunds

PledgeMusic had two distinct types of campaigns: direct-to-fan and preorder. In direct-to-fan campaigns, fans were not charged until the project target was reached. If a target was not reached, fans were not charged. In preorder campaigns, fans were charged immediately, and the artist was paid directly upon project completion.

Charity 
PledgeMusic artists had the option of donating a percentage of their total or post-goal revenue to a charity of their choice. As of 2014, 67% of projects had been linked with a charity. Artists without a cause in mind were able to meet with the company's charity outreach specialist to pair them up with charities.

Critique 
In 2010, while discussing the Digital Economy Bill Lord Errol, in the UK House of Lords, described PledgeMusic as a "rather clever idea" in the context of developing proportionate legal structures to protect copyright within the creative industry.

In June 2019, Musically reported that Kickstarter decided against launching a similar service due to being unable to find a sustainable business model that would support a high number of lower-volume creators.

Campaigns 
List of  artists that used the site to raise money:

In 2021, Kevin Godley's album Muscle Memory was completed and released by The state51 Conspiracy after the project stalled as a PledgeMusic campaign.

Charts 
Some albums backed via PledgeMusic have charted, including:
 Stiff Little Fingers – No Going Back – #1 in UK Rock Album Charts – #28 in UK Album Charts
 Ginger Wildheart – 100% – #27 in the UK
 Charlie Simpson – Young Pilgrim – #6 in the UK
 Ben Folds Five – The Sound Of The Life Of The Mind – #10 on the Billboard Top 200
 The Subways – Money and Celebrity – #16 in Germany, #43 in the UK
 Bring Me the Horizon – Sempiternal – #3 in the UK, #1 in Australia
 Lindsey Stirling – Shatter Me – #2 on the Billboard Top 200, #1 in both Classical and EDM
 Sevendust – Time Travelers and Bonfires – #19 in the US
 Kate Miller-Heidke – O Vertigo! – #3 in Australia
 311 – Stereolithic – #6 on the Billboard Top 200
 Mindi Abair – #1 on the Billboard Jazz chart
 Casey Crescenzo – #2 on the Billboard Classical chart
 The Puppini Sisters – The High Life – #1 debut on the UK iTunes Jazz Chart, #3 debut US iTunes Jazz Chart
 The String Cheese Incident — #1 Billboard Heatseekers, #4 Vinyl
 Thomas Rhett – #1 Billboard 200
 Gary Numan — #2 in the UK
 Rhydian Roberts – One Day Like This – #19 in UK Album Charts, #1 in UK Classical Albums Charts
 The Rifles – None the Wiser – #21 in UK Album Charts

Partnerships 
PledgeMusic Recordings and PledgeMusic Publishing had partnerships with the following companies:

 Myspace
 SonicBids
 SoundOut (Slicethepie's insight and analytics service)
 Lyric Financial
 Nimbit
 Topspin Media
 Artist Growth
 Firebrand
 INgrooves Fontana
 Inertia
 INDMusic
 The Agency Group

 Hotel Café for SXSW 2011 and 2012.

 CMJ (hosted showcases together)

Awards 
PledgeMusic was nominated for: 

 2010 BT Digital Music Awards in the category "Best Innovation or Gadget".

 2011 Music Week Awards in the category "Consumer-Facing Digital Music Service of the Year".

 2011 BT Digital Music Awards in the category "Best Innovation or Gadget".

 SoundCtrl's 2013 Best in Artist Support award.

 American Association of Independent Music 2013 Annual Libera Awards (The "LIBBYs") 21st Century Award – celebrating the service provider or platform that was most beneficial to Independent labels and artists.

PledgeMusic was noted as one of Billboard's "Five digital startups to watch in 2013".

PledgeMusic won the Grammy Music Technology Lab in 2013.

Co-founders Benji Rogers and Malcolm Dunbar were named to The Hospital Club 100 list in 2013 in the category of Music.

Benji Rogers, founder and ex-president of PledgeMusic, won A&R Worldwide's International Music Industry Awards' Distinguished Digital Executive of the Year, 2014.

See also 
Bandzoogle – similar services offered
Crowdsourcing
Comparison of crowdfunding services
Fan-funded music
Music 2.0
Netlabel
Social commerce
Web 2.0

References 
Notes

Citations

Online music stores of the United Kingdom
Crowdfunding platforms of the United Kingdom
Companies that have entered administration in the United Kingdom